General Grove may refer to:

Coleridge Grove (1839–1920), British Army major general
Edward Grove (1852–1932), British Army brigadier general
Marmaduke Grove (1878–1954), Chilean Air Force general